Ethos is a 2020 Turkish drama streaming television series directed by Berkun Oya and starring Öykü Karayel, Fatih Artman, Funda Eryiğit, Defne Kayalar, and Tülin Özen. The show was released on Netflix on 12 November 2020, consisting of one season for a total of 8 episodes. It was set and filmed in Istanbul, Turkey, and tells the story of a group of unique characters from dramatically different socio-cultural backgrounds meeting in startling circumstances.

Synopsis
Ethos tells the story of Meryem, a part-time cleaner from a conservative family who lives on the outskirts of Istanbul. She experiences fainting spells and consults Peri, a psychiatrist whose background is dramatically different from Meryem's: she is educated, wealthy, and secular, and holds prejudicial views of openly religious people. Peri herself sees a therapist, to whom she complains about the growing conservatism in Turkish society.
The series presents a variety of characters, including a rich but depressed playboy, a middle-class Kurdish family, a soap opera actress, a rape survivor, an ex-soldier, an intellectual, and a hodja and his closeted gay daughter, all of whom are somehow connected through Meryem, and together showcase the diversity of Turkish society.

Cast and characters
 Öykü Karayel as Meryem
 Fatih Artman as Yasin
 Funda Eryiğit as Ruhiye
 Defne Kayalar as Peri
 Settar Tanrıöğen as Ali Sadi (Hoca)
 Tülin Özen as Gülbin
 Gökhan Yıkılkan as Hilmi
 Alican Yücesoy as Sinan
 Bige Önal as Hayrünnisa
 Derya Karadaş as Gülan
 Öner Erkan as Rezan
 Nesrin Cavadzade as Melisa
 Nazmi Kırık as Civan
 Gülçin Kültür Şahin as Mesude
 Özge Özel as Canan
 Esme Madra as Burcu
 Aziz Çapkurt as Ramazan
 Cemre Zişan Sağbır as Esma
 Göktuğ Yıldırım as İsmail
 Nur Sürer as Feray
 Taner Birsel as Orhan
 Nihal Koldaş as Sinan's mother
 Sinan Tuzcu as soap opera actor

Episodes

Release
Ethos was released on 12 November 2020 on Netflix.

Reception
The series has received mostly positive reviews from critics and audiences. TRT World praised it for bringing many characters and perspectives together; however, it also noted that the series "falls short sometimes". Gazete Duvar also lauded the series concept and stated, "Ethos has put us all in the therapist's office and asked us to speak".

References

External links
 
 

2020s Turkish television series
2020 Turkish television series debuts
2020 Turkish television series endings
Turkish drama television series
Turkish-language Netflix original programming
Television shows set in Istanbul
Television series produced in Istanbul